Rosedale Abbey is a village in the Ryedale district of North Yorkshire, England.

History

Rosedale Priory
Overview of the priory:

 The priory was established by 1158 for nuns of the Cistercian order.  

 Rosedale was one of twenty four nunneries in Yorkshire. 

 Sheep farming was the main source of income.

 The priory closed in 1536 as a result of Henry VIII's dissolution of the monasteries.

 All that remains of the original building structure is a stair turret. 

 The Parish Church of St Mary & St Lawrence was built c.1894 on the foundations of the priory chapel.

A Cistercian Priory once stood on the site. All that is left today is a staircase turret, a sundial and a single stone pillar. Some headstones that seem to belong to nuns have been reported, though it is unclear whether they are in situ. Founded in 1158 or earlier, the priory was inhabited by a small group of nuns credited with being the first people to farm sheep commercially in the region - a quintessentially Cistercian practice driven by the order's desire to live "far from the concourse of men".

Little is known of the Priory. Unlike their male counterparts in nearby Fountains Abbey and Rievaulx Abbey, the nuns were probably not fluent writers. Furthermore the Cistercians were famed for their hostility to women, leaving nuns wishing to follow the Cistercian life in an awkward, unofficial position only partially connected to the rest of the Order. This is compounded by the fact that a house for nuns could not be founded, as male Cistercian abbeys were, by a party being sent out from an existing abbey able to trace its filiation all the way to the mother-house at Cîteaux Abbey in France.
It is therefore extremely difficult to guess what the Priory would have looked like (whereas Cistercian abbeys are highly formulaic). What stone remains is well finished and laid, but it is unclear where in the church it would have been and what ancillary buildings might have surrounded that church. Indeed this whole chapter of the valley's history is little understood, with only a handful of references remaining. There are records suggesting that the nuns at one point had to be moved following a raid by Scots. Another record reprimands the nuns for financial mismanagement and urges them not to give away so much in aid to the poor that they bankrupt themselves. Another reprimand tells them not to allow visitors into their dormitory and another warns them against allowing puppies into the church lest they disturb the service. 

It seems from these records that there was probably a steady population of between half a dozen and a dozen nuns.

The priory ceased to operate in 1536 owing to the Dissolution of the Monasteries. The buildings were left to decay, with what remained eventually being dismantled in the 19th century.

The stone was reused all around the village – including for a new church close to the priory church. but there are also suspiciously well-carved lintels built into garden walls, and sheds with well-cut ashlar stone. Many of the buildings now in the village have distinctly Gothic windows and two of the churches at least have circular windows (a common feature of Cistercian churches, which were all dedicated to the  Virgin Mary, of whom circular windows were a sign). It is unlikely that many (if any) of these stylistic details are remnants of the priory. They speak more of the Victorian sensibilities prevalent at the time that the population of the village soared but may well have mimicked traditions set out by the priory.

It is worth noting too that there is evidence that the local water-courses have been carefully managed – another common feature of Cistercian landscapes – and that there is a Monastic grange in Rosedale. Whilst it is easy to dismiss the priory as a small concern based on the small number of nuns and lack of surviving ruins, we must remember that Fountains Abbey is unlikely to have held more than a few dozen choir monks for much of its life, so really all we can say is that Rosedale Priory could have been very small, or could have been quite big, or could have been somewhere in between.

Mining
In the 19th century an iron ore mining industry was established. The population of the valley expanded rapidly until the demise of the mines in the 1920s.

Community
Rosedale Abbey consists of a collection of stone houses and public houses, St Mary & St Lawrence Church, an art gallery, tea room, a sandwich shop, glass studio and a village green.

Tourism in the area has developed into a major industry, with many smaller properties renovated for private holiday homes or as self-catering accommodation. Hotels, larger properties and farms provide bed and breakfast accommodation.

Recently a local parish council election attracted candidates opposed to the construction of affordable housing close to their properties.

Rosedale Show is held in the village each August and attracts some 5,000 visitors. The show dates back to 1871 and is one of the oldest in North Yorkshire.

The notoriously steep road known as Chimney Bank starts in the village, though the chimney that gave it its name was demolished in 1972.

For such a small village Rosedale boasts both a football and cricket team. 
The football team, managed by Alastair Wilkinson, competes in the Ryedale Beckett League Division 1 and the cricket team, captained by William Sullivan, competes in the Feversham League, which they won in the 2019 season.

See also
 North York Moors
 List of monastic houses in North Yorkshire
 North Yorkshire
 North Yorkshire County Council
 Ryedale district authority

References

Notes

Citations

Sources

External links

 North York Moors, North York Moors National Park Authority
 Rosedale and District Show
 Rosedale Abbey web site

Cistercian monasteries in England
Villages in North Yorkshire
Tourist attractions in North Yorkshire
Monasteries in North Yorkshire
Religious organizations established in the 1150s
Christian monasteries established in the 12th century
1158 establishments in England
1535 disestablishments in England